Punzo were a Cuban baseball team that played in the Cuban Summer Championship in 1904. The club featured players mostly from the Cuban League and were managed by Alberto Azoy.

Notable players
Alfredo Arcaño
Julián Castillo
Gervasio González
Valentín González
Carlos Morán
Luis Padrón
Rogelio Valdés

References

External links
Franchise history at Seamheads.com

Defunct baseball teams in Cuba